Xu Meishuang  (born 28 May 1986) is a Chinese women's international footballer who plays as a goalkeeper. She is a member of the China women's national football team. She was part of the team at the 2007 FIFA Women's World Cup. On club level she plays for Changchun Yatai in China.

References

1986 births
Living people
Chinese women's footballers
China women's international footballers
Place of birth missing (living people)
2007 FIFA Women's World Cup players
Women's association football goalkeepers